These are the results of the Kickboxing at the 2021 Islamic Solidarity Games which took place between 16 and 18 August 2022 in Konya, Turkey.

Full contact

Men

51 kg

54 kg

60 kg

63.5 kg

67 kg

71 kg

75 kg

81 kg

86 kg

91 kg

Women

48 kg

52 kg

56 kg

60 kg

65 kg

70 kg

Low kick

Men

51 kg

54 kg

57 kg

60 kg

63.5 kg

67 kg

71 kg

75 kg

81 kg

86 kg

+91 kg

Women

52 kg

56 kg

60 kg

65 kg

References

2021 Islamic Solidarity Games